Anobrium rugosicolle is a species of beetle in the family Cerambycidae. It was described by Galileo and Martins in 2002. It is known from Peru and Brazil.

References

Pteropliini
Beetles described in 2002